Insam may refer to:
Ginseng, also known as "insam", an alternative name borrowed from the Korean language
Insam-cha, a Korean tisane (herbal tea) made from ginseng

People with the family name Insam include:

 Adolf Insam (born 1951), Italian ice hockey player and coach
Evelyn Insam (born 1994), Italian ski jumper
Grita Insam, Austrian gallerist, recipient of a 2009 Austrian Decoration for Science and Art
Marco Insam (born 1989), Italian professional ice hockey player